Mount Ouray is a high and prominent mountain summit in the far southern Sawatch Range of the Rocky Mountains of North America. The mountain was named in honor of Ute Chief Ouray.

Mountain
Mount Ouray makes up the southern tip of Sawatch Mountains, rising 7,000 feet above the Arkansas River Valley. Monarch Pass is four miles northwest of the peak.

The mountain is named after the Ute Chief Ouray.  Nearby Mount Chipeta, just over a mile to the northwest of Mount Ouray, is named after Chief Ouray's wife.

Routes
The standard route is the west ridge.  Starting at Marshall Pass, the route heads north along the Continental Divide until the west ridge of Mount Ouray is reached. From there,  one can hike east along this ridge up to the summit.

Historical names
Hump Mountain
Mount Ouray – 1962 
Ouray Mountain
Ouray Peak – 1906  (there is a different Ouray Peak in northern Chaffee County)

See also

List of mountain peaks of North America
List of mountain peaks of the United States
List of mountain peaks of Colorado

References

External links

Ouray
Ouray
Ouray
San Isabel National Forest
Colorado placenames of Native American origin
Ouray